Hilb, Rogal, & Hobbs Co. was an American insurance company. It was established by Bob Hilb, Alvin Rogal and David Hamilton, former Insurance Management Corporation executives in 1982 as Hilb, Rogal, and Hamilton Corporation was changed to Hilb, Rogal and Hobbs Corporation on September 8, 2003. The company operated over 120 offices in 29 U.S. states and London with branch locations in Russia, South Africa, and Australia. Since its establishment, HRH had acquired over 230 independent agencies ranging from individuals to large national accounts with a focus on middle-market and internal risk management for major firms. As of 2007 sales were $799,664,000. It was acquired by Willis Towers Watson for $2.1 billion in 2008.

History
On January 28, 1982, Hilb, Rogal, & Hamilton Co. was founded by Bob Hilb, Alvin Rogal and David Hamilton. 
In January 1999, the Daytona Beach, FL and Fort Lauderdale, FL offices of Hilb Rogal & Hamilton were acquired by Poe & Brown, Inc. (now Brown & Brown, Inc.) 
On May 12, 2002 Hilb, Rogal & Hamilton is ranked 10th largest insurance intermediary in the world.
On September 8, 2003 Hilb, Rogal & Hamilton was officially changed to Hilb, Rogal & Hobbs Co.
In July 2007, Hilb Rogal & Hobbs Co. was ranked ninth in [[Crain Communications|Business Insurance]]'s world's largest brokers list.
On June 9, 2008, Hilb Rogal & Hobbs Co accepted an acquisition offer by Willis Group Holdings, a British insurer for 2.1 billion.
In 2004, Haack & Associates was bought by Hilb, Rogal & Hobbs Co.

References

External links
 http://www.hrh.com/WillisHRH/ Official site]

Insurance companies of the United States
Financial services companies established in 1982
2008 mergers and acquisitions
1982 establishments in Virginia
Financial services companies of the United States